Lutefisk (Norwegian,  in Northern and parts of Central Norway,  in Southern Norway;  ;  ; literally "lye fish") is dried whitefish (normally cod, but ling and burbot are also used). It is made from aged stockfish (air-dried whitefish), or dried and salted cod, cured in lye. It is gelatinous in texture after being rehydrated for days prior to eating.

Lutefisk is prepared as a seafood dish  of several Nordic countries. It is traditionally part of the Christmas feast Norwegian julebord and Swedish julbord, as well as the similar Finnish joulupöytä.

Origin 

Preserved fish provided protein for generations in a part of the world with a strong fishing tradition. It is not known when people first started treating dried fish with lye. The reason was probably that the lack of major salt deposits in the area favored the drying process for the preservation of whitefish, a process known for millennia.

Stockfish is very nutrient-rich and was consumed domestically, although it was during the boom in the stockfish trade in the late Middle Ages that the product became accessible throughout Scandinavia, as well as the rest of Europe. The higher quality stockfish would be soaked in water, then boiled and eaten with melted butter. Lower grade qualities would be harder and more fuel-consuming to boil, and it has been suggested that adding ash from beech or birch in the boiling water would break down the protein chains and speed up the process. The introduction of lye in the preparation process might therefore have been incidental.

Preparation 

For it to become edible, lutefisk must again be soaked in cold water. The first step is soaking for five to six days, with the water changed daily. The saturated lutefisk is then soaked in an unchanged solution of cold water and lye for an additional two days. The fish swells during this soaking, and its protein content decreases by more than 50 percent, producing a jelly-like consistency.

When this treatment is finished, the fish (saturated with lye) is inedible, having a pH of 11–12. To make the fish edible, a final treatment of yet another four to six days of soaking in cold water (also changed daily) is needed. The lutefisk is then ready to be cooked.

Cooking
After the preparation, the lutefisk is saturated with water and must therefore be cooked extremely carefully so that it does not fall to pieces.

To create a firm consistency in lutefisk, it is common to spread a layer of salt over the fish about half an hour before it is cooked. This "releases" some of the water in the fish meat. The salt must be rinsed off carefully before cooking.

Lutefisk does not need additional water for the cooking; it is sufficient to place it in a pan, salt it, seal the lid tightly, and let it steam cook under a very low heat for 20–25 minutes. An alternative is to wrap in aluminium foil and bake at 225 °C (435 °F) for 40–50 minutes.

Another option is to parboil lutefisk, wrapped in cheesecloth and gently boiled until tender. Lutefisk can also be boiled directly in a pan of water. Lutefisk may also be cooked in a microwave oven. The average cooking time is 8–10 minutes per whole fish (a package of two fish sides) at high power in a covered glass cooking dish, preferably made of heat-resistant glass. Cooking times vary, depending on the power of the microwave oven.

Eating
Lutefisk is traditionally served with boiled potatoes, mashed green peas, melted butter and small pieces of fried bacon.

In Norway, Sweden and Finland, lutefisk is a part of the Christmas tradition and is mostly eaten with boiled potatoes, green peas and white sauce. Regional variations include a sprinkle of freshly ground allspice or black pepper and the addition of coarsely ground mustard in the white sauce (in Scania). In parts of Jämtland it is served on flat bread along with whey cheese.

In the United States, lutefisk is often served with a variety of side dishes, including bacon, peas, pea stew, potatoes, lefse, gravy, mashed rutabaga, white sauce, melted or clarified butter, syrup, and geitost, or "old" cheese (gammelost). It is sometimes eaten with meatballs, which is not traditional in Scandinavia. Side dishes vary greatly from family to family and region to region, and can be a source of jovial contention when eaters of different traditions of lutefisk dine together.

The taste of well-prepared lutefisk is very mild, and the white sauce is often spiced with pepper or other strong-tasting spices. In Minnesota and Wisconsin, this method (seasoned with allspice) is common among Swedish-Americans, while Norwegian-Americans often prefer to eat it unseasoned with melted butter or cream sauce.

Modern consumption
Lutefisk as a Christmas season meal has gained attention in Norway over the past 20 years. The Norwegian Seafood Export Council indicated sales of lutefisk to restaurants and catering companies in Norway increased by 72% between 2005 and 2008. A 2005 survey found 20% of Norwegians ate lutefisk during the Christmas holiday season, although only 3% would consider it for their Christmas dinner.

Far more lutefisk is consumed in the United States than in Scandinavia, much of it in the Midwestern United States by Scandinavian Americans in Lutheran churches and fraternal lodges. 

Madison, Minnesota has dubbed itself the "lutefisk capital of the world" as well as claiming the largest per capita consumption of lutefisk in Minnesota. St. Olaf College in Northfield, Minnesota serves lutefisk during their Christmas Festival concerts. They also host an annual music festival called "Lutefest". Lutefisk, though, is not served at this festival.

Many Lutheran churches across Wisconsin also serve Lutefisk dinners as a yearly tradition. Four popular churches are St. Olaf Lutheran Church in Dodge County, Christ Lutheran Church in DeForest, Orfordville Lutheran Church in Rock County and Northland Lutheran Church in Iola.

Lutefisk is also consumed in Canada because of its relatively large Scandinavian population, particularly in the traditionally agricultural, inland provinces of Western Canada. As of 2016, there are about 463,000 Norwegian Canadians, 350,000 Swedish Canadians, 207,000 Danish Canadians and 143,000 Finnish Canadians. Organizations such as the Sons of Norway hold annual lutefisk dinners. Lutefisk is sometimes available in specialty stores and supermarkets where there are large Scandinavian populations. Kingman, Alberta proclaims itself on its greeting sign to be the "Lutefisk capital of Alberta".

Folklore
An article in Smithsonian magazine quotes some oft-rendered tall tales regarding the origins of the dish:

There are many jokes about lutefisk. Some of these jokes are printed on T-shirts, bumper stickers, and coffee mugs, e.g. "Legalize lutefisk" or "I have tried lutefisk twice, once going down, and another time coming back up".

Spellings
  or 
  (earlier  spelling still sometimes used in English) or 
 
  or

See also

 : Portuguese dish also made of reconstituted dried fish.

References

Other sources
Gary Legwold (1996) The Last Word on Lutefisk: True Tales of Cod and Tradition   (Conrad Henry PR)  
Mark Kurlansky Walker (1998) Cod: A Biography of the Fish That Changed the World (Penguin Books)

External links

 
 Lutefisk for Christmas
 
  
 , Boone & Erickson
 O Lutefisk (Full lyrics)

Christmas food
Fish dishes
Norwegian cuisine
Swedish cuisine
Finnish cuisine
Scandinavian cuisine
Cuisine of Minnesota
Cuisine of Wisconsin
Cuisine of the Midwestern United States
Cod dishes